In ice hockey, power forward (PWF) is a loosely applied characterization of a forward who is big and strong, equally capable of playing physically or scoring goals and would most likely have high totals in both points and penalties. It is usually used in reference to a forward who is physically large, with the toughness to dig the puck out of the corners, possesses offensive instincts, has mobility, puck-handling skills, may be difficult to knock off the puck or to push away from the front of the goal and willingly engage in fights when he feels it is required.  Possessing both physical size and offensive ability, power forwards are also often referred to as the 'complete' hockey player.

Historically, power forward was not originally a hockey term, finding comparatively recent origins from basketball. Harry Sinden, former president of the Boston Bruins, claims power forward first became part of hockey terminology because of the style of play of Cam Neely, an NHL player from 1983 to 1996, who could play ruggedly and also score goals.

Punch Broadbent was one of the first players who pioneered the style before the NHL was founded in 1917, while Charlie Conacher, Phil Esposito, Gordie Howe, Maurice Richard and Bert Olmstead are likewise considered quintessential examples of power forwards in the decades before the term entered hockey vernacular.

NHL players described as power forwards
 Hockey Hall of Fame inductee

References

Ice hockey terminology
Ice hockey strategy